A penumbral lunar eclipse took place on Tuesday, September 27, 1977, the second of two lunar eclipses in 1977. At maximum eclipse, 90.076% of the Moon's disc was partially shaded by the Earth, which caused a slight shadow gradient across its disc; this subtle effect may have been visible to careful observers. No part of the Moon was in complete shadow. The eclipse lasted 4 hours, 17 minutes and 35.5 seconds overall. Occurring 6.2 days before apogee (Apogee on October 3, 1977), the Moon's apparent diameter was 2.2% smaller than average.

Visibility 
It was completely visible over east in Asia, Australia, Pacific, North America and South America, seen rising over Asia, East China Sea and Australia and setting over the Atlantic and South America.

Related lunar eclipses

Eclipses in 1977 
 A partial lunar eclipse on Monday, 4 April 1977.
 An annular solar eclipse on Monday, 18 April 1977.
 A penumbral lunar eclipse on Tuesday, 27 September 1977.
 A total solar eclipse on Wednesday, 12 October 1977.

Lunar year series

Half-Saros cycle
A lunar eclipse will be preceded and followed by solar eclipses by 9 years and 5.5 days (a half saros). This lunar eclipse is related to two solar eclipses of Solar Saros 124.

See also 
List of lunar eclipses
List of 20th-century lunar eclipses

Notes

External links 
 

1977-09
1977 in science
September 1977 events